Hilliard's Bay Provincial Park  is a provincial park in Alberta, Canada.

It was established on October 24, 1978, and is maintained by Alberta Tourism, Parks and Recreation.

Amenities
The park has an overnight camping ground at Hilliard's Bay, which includes a boat launch site and playgrounds, and three day use areas, all powered.

Activities
The following activities are available in the park:
Beach activities
Camping
Canoeing/kayaking
Fishing
Group camping
Hiking - front country
Horseshoes
Ice fishing
Power boating
Sailing
Swimming
Water-skiing
Windsurfing

See also
List of provincial parks in Alberta
List of Canadian provincial parks
List of Canadian national parks

References

External links

Big Lakes County
Provincial parks of Alberta